Vicente Luque (born November 27, 1991) is an American and Brazilian professional mixed martial artist. Luque currently competes in the welterweight division of the Ultimate Fighting Championship (UFC). As of March 7, 2023, he is #10 in the UFC welterweight rankings.

Background
Luque was born in Westwood, New Jersey, on November 27, 1991, to a Brazilian mother and a Chilean father. His maternal grandmother was a diplomat, and as a result, his mother was mostly raised in Chile, where she met and married his father before relocating to the United States. Luque was raised trilingual, speaking Portuguese, Spanish and English. Luque began training in various forms of martial arts as a youngster, initially karate at the age of three. When Vicente was six, his parents separated and he moved to Brazil with his mom, where he continued training karate until the age of ten. After a spell with soccer, he started training in Muay Thai and Brazilian jiu-jitsu as a teenager before transitioning to mixed martial arts in 2008. In 2021, he was promoted to black belt in both Brazilian Jiu Jitsu and Luta Livre on the same day.

Mixed martial arts career

Early career
Luque made his professional mixed martial arts debut in June 2009. He compiled a record of 7–4–1, competing for various regional promotions in Brazil before trying out for The Ultimate Fighter in early 2014.

The Ultimate Fighter
In February 2015, it was announced that Luque was one of the fighters selected to be on The Ultimate Fighter: American Top Team vs. Blackzilians.

In his first fight on the show, Luque faced Nathan Coy. He won the fight by submission in the second round.

In the semifinals, Luque faced off against Hayder Hassan. He lost the fight via split decision.

Ultimate Fighting Championship
Luque made his official debut for the promotion on July 12, 2015 at The Ultimate Fighter 21 Finale, where he faced fellow castmate Michael Graves. He lost the fight via unanimous decision.

Luque next faced Hayder Hassan in a rematch on December 19, 2015 at UFC on Fox 17.  He won the fight by submission in the first round and was awarded a Performance of the Night bonus.

Luque faced Álvaro Herrera on July 7, 2016 at UFC Fight Night 90. He won the fight via submission in the second round.

Luque faced Héctor Urbina on September 24, 2016 at UFC Fight Night 95. Luque won the fight via first-round knockout, thereby earning his second Performance of the Night bonus.

Luque returned to face Belal Muhammad on November 12, 2016 at UFC 205. He won the fight via knockout in the first round.

Luque faced Leon Edwards on March 18, 2017 at UFC Fight Night 107. He lost the fight by unanimous decision.

Luque faced Niko Price, replacing an injured Luan Chagas  on 11 day notice, on October 28, 2017 at UFC Fight Night: Machida vs. Brunson. After knocking Price down, Luque won the fight by submission via D’Arce choke midway through the second round.

Luque faced Chad Laprise on May 19, 2018 at UFC Fight Night 129. He won the fight via knockout in the first round.

Luque faced promotional newcomer Jalin Turner on October 6, 2018 at UFC 229. He won the fight via knockout in the first round.

Luque faced Bryan Barberena on February 17, 2019 at UFC on ESPN 1. After two competitive rounds that saw both men rock each other, Luque won the fight by TKO at the end of the third round after knocking Barberena down with a knee and finishing with punches. With this win, he became the first man to give Barberena his first stoppage loss by TKO. This fight earned him the Fight of the Night award.

Luque was expected to face Neil Magny on May 18, 2019 at UFC Fight Night 152. However, it was reported on May 13, 2019 that Magny pulled out of the bout due to testing positive for Di-Hydroxy-LGD-4033, and he was replaced by newcomer Derrick Krantz. Luque won the fight via technical knockout in round one.

Luque faced Mike Perry on August 10, 2019 at UFC on ESPN+ 14. He won the fight via split decision. This fight earned him the Fight of the Night award.

Luque faced Stephen Thompson on November 2, 2019 at UFC 244. He lost the fight via unanimous decision. This fight earned him the Fight of the Night award.

Luque was scheduled to face Randy Brown on April 11, 2020 at UFC Fight Night: Overeem vs. Harris. Due to the COVID-19 pandemic, the event was eventually postponed.

In a quick turnaround, Luque was scheduled to face Niko Price in a rematch on April 18, 2020 at UFC 249. However, on April 9, Dana White, the president of UFC announced that this event was postponed and the bout eventually took place on May 9, 2020. He won the fight via technical knockout due to doctor stoppage in round three.

The bout with Randy Brown was rescheduled and took place on August 1, 2020 at UFC Fight Night: Brunson vs. Shahbazyan. Utilizing low kicks and dropping Brown multiple times, Luque eventually won the fight via knockout in the second round. This win earned him the Performance of the Night award.

Luque faced Tyron Woodley on March 27, 2021 at UFC 260. After hurting Woodley multiple times on the feet, Luque won the fight via D'Arce choke submission in round one.  This fight earned him the Fight of the Night  award.

Luque faced Michael Chiesa on August 7, 2021 at UFC 265. He won the fight via D'Arce choke submission in round one.  This fight earned him the  Performance of the Night award.

Luque was the emergency backup for the UFC Welterweight Championship rematch between Kamaru Usman and Colby Covington in the main event of UFC 268. However, Luque weighed in at 172.2 pounds, 2.2 pounds over the welterweight limit. Usman and Covington both made weight and the championship bout proceeded as scheduled.

Luque faced Belal Muhammad in a rematch on April 16, 2022 at UFC on ESPN 34. He lost the fight via unanimous decision.

Luque faced Geoff Neal on August 6, 2022, at UFC on ESPN 40. He lost the fight via knockout in round three.

Personal life
Luque and his wife Carol have a son, Bento (born May 2021 in Brasília, Brazil).

Championships and accomplishments
Ultimate Fighting Championship
Performance of the Night (Four times) 
Fight of the Night (Four times) 
 Second most finishes in UFC Welterweight division history (13)
 Second highest finishes-per-win percentage in UFC history (13 finishes / 14 wins: 92.86%) 
 MMAJunkie.com
 2019 February Fight of the Month vs. Bryan Barberena
 2020 May Fight of the Month vs. Niko Price
 2021 March Fight of the Month vs. Tyron Woodley
 2021 August Submission of the Month vs. Michael Chiesa

Mixed martial arts record

|-
|
| style="text-align:center" |
|Geoff Neal
|KO (punches)
|UFC on ESPN: Santos vs. Hill
|
| style="text-align:center" |3
| style="text-align:center" |2:01
|Las Vegas, Nevada, United States
|
|-
|Loss
| style="text-align:center" | 
|Belal Muhammad
|Decision (unanimous)
|UFC on ESPN: Luque vs. Muhammad 2 
|
| style="text-align:center" | 5
| style="text-align:center" | 5:00
|Las Vegas, Nevada, United States
|
|-
|Win
| style="text-align:center" | 
|Michael Chiesa
|Submission (brabo choke)
|UFC 265 
|
| style="text-align:center" | 1
| style="text-align:center" | 3:25
|Houston, Texas, United States
|
|-
|Win
| style="text-align:center" | 
|Tyron Woodley
|Submission (brabo choke)
|UFC 260 
|
| style="text-align:center" | 1
| style="text-align:center" | 3:56
|Las Vegas, Nevada, United States
|
|-
|Win
| style="text-align:center" | 
|Randy Brown
|KO (knee and punches)
|UFC Fight Night: Brunson vs. Shahbazyan
|
| style="text-align:center" | 2
| style="text-align:center" | 4:56
|Las Vegas, Nevada, United States
|
|-
|Win
| style="text-align:center" | 18–7–1
|Niko Price
|TKO (doctor stoppage)
|UFC 249 
|
| style="text-align:center" | 3
| style="text-align:center" | 3:37
|Jacksonville, Florida, United States
|
|-
|Loss
| style="text-align:center" | 17–7–1
|Stephen Thompson
|Decision (unanimous)
|UFC 244 
|
| style="text-align:center" | 3
| style="text-align:center" | 5:00
|New York City, New York, United States 
|
|-
|Win
| style="text-align:center" | 17–6–1
|Mike Perry
|Decision (split)
|UFC Fight Night: Shevchenko vs. Carmouche 2 
|
| style="text-align:center" | 3
| style="text-align:center" | 5:00
|Montevideo, Uruguay
|
|-
|Win
| style="text-align:center" | 16–6–1
|Derrick Krantz
|TKO (punches)
|UFC Fight Night: dos Anjos vs. Lee 
|
| style="text-align:center" | 1
| style="text-align:center" | 3:52
|Rochester, New York, United States
|
|-
|Win
| style="text-align:center" | 15–6–1
|Bryan Barberena
|TKO (knees and punches)
|UFC on ESPN: Ngannou vs. Velasquez 
|
| style="text-align:center" | 3
| style="text-align:center" | 4:54
|Phoenix, Arizona, United States
| 
|-
|Win
| style="text-align:center" | 14–6–1
|Jalin Turner
|KO (punches)
|UFC 229 
|
| style="text-align:center" | 1
| style="text-align:center" | 3:52
|Las Vegas, Nevada, United States
|
|- 
|Win
| style="text-align:center" | 13–6–1
|Chad Laprise
|KO (punches)
|UFC Fight Night: Maia vs. Usman
|
| style="text-align:center" | 1
| style="text-align:center" | 4:16
|Santiago, Chile
|
|- 
|Win
| style="text-align:center" | 12–6–1
|Niko Price
|Submission (brabo choke)
|UFC Fight Night: Brunson vs. Machida
|
| style="text-align:center" | 2
| style="text-align:center" | 4:08
|São Paulo, Brazil
|
|-
|Loss
| style="text-align:center" | 11–6–1
|Leon Edwards
|Decision (unanimous)
|UFC Fight Night: Manuwa vs. Anderson
|
| style="text-align:center" | 3
| style="text-align:center" | 5:00
|London, England
| 
|-
|Win
| style="text-align:center" | 11–5–1
|Belal Muhammad
|KO (punches)
|UFC 205
|
| style="text-align:center" | 1
| style="text-align:center" | 1:19
|New York City, New York, United States
| 
|-
|Win
| style="text-align:center" | 10–5–1
|Héctor Urbina
|KO (punch)
|UFC Fight Night: Cyborg vs. Länsberg
|
| style="text-align:center" | 1
| style="text-align:center" | 1:00
|Brasília, Brazil
|
|-
| Win
| style="text-align:center" | 9–5–1
| Álvaro Herrera
| Submission (brabo choke)
| UFC Fight Night: dos Anjos vs. Alvarez
| 
| style="text-align:center" | 2
| style="text-align:center" | 3:52
| Las Vegas, Nevada, United States
|
|-
| Win
| style="text-align:center" | 8–5–1
| Hayder Hassan
| Technical Submission (anaconda choke)
| UFC on Fox: dos Anjos vs. Cowboy 2
| 
| style="text-align:center" | 1
| style="text-align:center" | 2:13
| Orlando, Florida, United States
| 
|-
| Loss
| style="text-align:center" | 7–5–1
| Michael Graves
| Decision (unanimous)
| The Ultimate Fighter: American Top Team vs. Blackzilians Finale
| 
| style="text-align:center" | 3
| style="text-align:center" | 5:00
| Las Vegas, Nevada, United States
| 
|-
| Win
| style="text-align:center" | 7–4–1
| Paulistenio Rocha
| Decision (unanimous)
| Açaí do Japa Fight
| 
| style="text-align:center" | 3
| style="text-align:center" | 5:00
| Brasília, Brazil
| 
|-
| Loss
| style="text-align:center" | 6–4–1
| Carlos Alexandre Pereira
| Submission (arm-triangle choke)
| Smash Fight 2
| 
| style="text-align:center" | 3
| style="text-align:center" | 0:44
| Curitiba, Brazil
| 
|-
| Win
| style="text-align:center" | 6–3–1
| Marcelo Lisboa
| TKO
| Capital Fight 5
| 
| style="text-align:center" | 1
| style="text-align:center" | 1:31
| Brasília, Brazil
| 
|-
| Win
| style="text-align:center" | 5–3–1
| Yuri Moura
| Submission (anaconda choke)
| Imperium MMA Pro 2
| 
| style="text-align:center" | 2
| style="text-align:center" | 1:07
| Salvador, Brazil
|
|- 
| Loss
| style="text-align:center" | 4–3–1
| Alfredo Souza
| Decision (split)
| CPMMAF
| 
| style="text-align:center" | 3
| style="text-align:center" | 5:00
| Salvador, Brazil
|
|- 
| Win
| style="text-align:center" | 4–2–1
| Thiago Santos
| TKO (punches)
| Spartan MMA 2012
| 
| style="text-align:center" | 1
| style="text-align:center" | 4:50
| São Luís, Brazil
|
|-
| Win
| style="text-align:center" | 3–2–1
| Darlan Almeida
| Submission (arm-triangle choke)
| Demo Fight 6
| 
| style="text-align:center" | 1
| style="text-align:center" | 3:25
| Salvador, Brazil
|
|- 
| Loss
| style="text-align:center" | 2–2–1
| Marcos Antonio Santana
| Decision (split)
| Jungle Fight 27
| 
| style="text-align:center" | 3
| style="text-align:center" | 5:00
| Brasília, Brazil
|
|- 
| Draw
| style="text-align:center" | 2–1–1
| Rodrigo Medeiros
| Draw 
| Shooto Brazil 18
| 
| style="text-align:center" | 3
| style="text-align:center" | 5:00
| Brasília, Brazil
| 
|-
| Loss
| style="text-align:center" | 2–1
| Felipe Portela
| Submission (triangle armbar)
| Capital Fight 2
| 
| style="text-align:center" | 3
| style="text-align:center" | 3:00
| Brasília, Brazil
|
|- 
| Win
| style="text-align:center" | 2–0
| Pedro Borges Dos Santos
| Submission (guillotine choke)
| The Gladiators 2
| 
| style="text-align:center" | 1
| style="text-align:center" | 3:58
| Guará, Brazil
|
|- 
| Win
| style="text-align:center" | 1–0
| Andre Playboy
| TKO (punches)
| Fight Club 300
| 
| style="text-align:center" | 1
| style="text-align:center" | 2:52
| Brasília, Brazil
|
|- 

|-
|Loss
|align=center|1–1
|Hayder Hassan
|Decision (split)
|rowspan=2| The Ultimate Fighter: American Top Team vs. Blackzilians
| (airdate)
|align=center|3
|align=center|5:00
|Coconut Creek, Florida, United States
|rowspan=2|
|-
|Win
|align=center|1–0
|Nathan Coy
|Submission (anaconda choke)
| (airdate)
|align=center|3
|align=center|2:26
|Boca Raton, Florida, United States
|-

See also
 List of current UFC fighters
 List of male mixed martial artists

References

External links
 
 

1991 births
American male mixed martial artists
American sportspeople of Brazilian descent
American people of Portuguese descent

American people of Chilean descent
Sportspeople of Chilean descent
Welterweight mixed martial artists
Mixed martial artists utilizing Muay Thai
Mixed martial artists utilizing Luta Livre
Mixed martial artists utilizing Brazilian jiu-jitsu
Living people
People from Westwood, New Jersey
Mixed martial artists from New Jersey
Sportspeople from Brasília
American expatriate sportspeople in Brazil
Ultimate Fighting Championship male fighters
American practitioners of Brazilian jiu-jitsu
People awarded a black belt in Brazilian jiu-jitsu
American Muay Thai practitioners